Felix D. "Dody" Roach (May 3, 1937 – September 7, 2004) was an American poker player from Corpus Christi, Texas, who won two bracelets at the World Series of Poker.

Career
Roach won his first bracelet at the 1981 WSOP in the $1,000 No Limit Hold'em tournament.  In 1982, he made the final table of the $10,000 Main Event.  Roach finished in 6th place, earning a $41,060 cash prize in the event which was won by Jack Straus.

Roach won his second bracelet in 1996, in the $1,500 Limit Omaha event.  In the heads-up play, he defeated multi bracelet winner Men Nguyen "the Master" to win the bracelet and $102,600 prize.

His total tournament cashes were $490,649.  His 10 cashes at the World Series of Poker accounted for $283,734 of that total.

In 2004, Roach died at age 67.

World Series of Poker Bracelets

References

External links
WSOP Profile   
Hendon Mob database

1937 births
2004 deaths
American poker players
World Series of Poker bracelet winners
People from Corpus Christi, Texas